Secret Ambition may refer to:

Secret Ambition, 1930s US radio show hosted by Tom Breneman
"Secret Ambition", single by Michael W. Smith  from his 1988 album i 2 (EYE)
"Secret Ambition" (song), Japanese song by Nana Mizuki